Her Dangerous Path is a 1923 American adventure film serial directed by Roy Clements.

Cast 
 Edna Murphy as Corinne Grant
 Charley Chase as Glen Harper (as Charles Parrott)
 Hayford Hobbs as Donald Bartlett
 William F. Moran as Dr. Philip Markham
 Scott Pembroke as Dr. Harrison (as Percy Pembroke)
 William Gillespie as John Dryden
 Glenn Tryon as Reporter
 Ray Myers as Clinton Hodge
 Colin Kenny as Stanley Fleming
 Eddie Baker as Jack Reynolds (as Ed Baker)
 Fred McPherson as Professor Comstock
 Frank Lackteen as Malay George
 Sam Lufkin as Sam Comstock
 Fong Wong as Oracle of the Sands

See also 
 List of film serials
 List of film serials by studio

References

External links 
 

1923 films
1923 adventure films
American silent serial films
American black-and-white films
American adventure films
1920s American films
Silent adventure films
1920s English-language films